Hirekeruru is a panchayat town in Haveri district in the Indian state of Karnataka.  The name "the village of the big pond" (from the components hire "ಹಿರೆ", big; kere "ಕೆರೆ", pond; and uru, village). The name is pronounced as "Hee ray kay roor".

Geography 
It has an average elevation of 619 metres (2030 ft). Varkavi Sarwagnya born near Hirekerur in an Abalur village.

Demographics
, according to the India census, Hirekerur has a population of 15,874. Males constitute 51% of the population and females 49%. Hirekerur has an average literacy rate of 71%, higher than the national average of 59.5%: male literacy is 76%, and female literacy is 66%. In Hirekerur, 13% of the population is under six years of age.

The taluq of Hirekerur exerts administrative control over more than 130 villages, making it the largest Taluq (in terms of number of settlements covered) in Karnataka state.

Religion and Culture
Hirekerur houses a famous Durga Devi temple, located close to the village's  lake, Durga devi kere. Several religions are represented among the local population, and all collaborate in the Durgadevi Festival (Jatra) held once every three years. The jatra attracts between 80-100,000 visitors from across India, and especially from Maharashtra state. Near by Temple we can notice the ruined temple pillars but archeology department completely neglected them and also we can find an Ancient ruined temple near by Durga devi temple with old inscriptions but no one bothered about them.

Education facilities in the town used to supply schooling up to higher education level, and students travel in from surrounding villages to attend Hirekerur's schools. Now with the growing population of the city and surrounding villages new Pre University colleges and Degree colleges have started providing education. It has approx 3 Pre University colleges and has one Degree colleges which offers graduation in Arts and Commerce. There is lot of prominence given to sports in the region especially to volleyball. The local education board has a policy of promoting 100% literacy in Hirekerur. High school graduates wishing to pursue further study generally move to cities including Haunsabhavi, Hubli, Belgaum, Davanagere Shivamogga and Bengaluru.

Entertainment
Hirekerur has four new theaters. Attractions in the region include the site of Madag Masur (Kenchamm Devi), which includes a lake with waterfalls; Byadagi city at 29 km distance; the seed and cotton marketplace 38 km from the town at Ranebennur, and the Joga Falls 80 km from city. Kaginele peetha, the birthplace of famous saint-poet Kanakdasa is at 24.4 km from hirekerur. Ancient Kadambeshwara Temple and Veerabhadreshwara Temple Rattihalli 12 km from Hirekerur Ancient Abaluru Basavanna And Someshwara Temple .

Transport
Hirekerur is served by buses operated by the NWKRTC. It was one of the first town in Haveri district to receive bus services. It is not yet connected by Rail and Air.

Notable residents and former residents
Abalur, within the Hirekerur taluq and 12 km from Hirekerur village, was the birthplace of the Kannada-language poet Sarvajña.

References 
www.hirekerur.com Hirekerur commercial website

Hirekerur website

Cities and towns in Haveri district